Bartholomaeus Praetorius (1590?–1623?) was a German composer. He was born around 1590 in Malbork in the Kingdom of Poland. He studied at the University of Königsberg and subsequently was employed by King Gustavus Adolphus in Sweden. Some of his motets and five part instrumental music has survived. He died in 1623.

References
 Newe Liebliche Paduanen und Galliarden (Berlin, 1616)

External links

1590 births
1623 deaths
Year of birth uncertain
Year of death uncertain
17th-century German composers
People from the Kingdom of Prussia
People from Malbork